The Mee-Ow Show is a musical-comedy revue produced by students at Northwestern University in Evanston, Illinois. It was founded in 1974 by two students: Paul Warshauer and Josh Lazar. The original Mee-Ow Show, "Just in Time," was the first performance in the newly constructed McCormick Auditorium in Norris University Center (Northwestern's student union). The show has been a staple of the Northwestern theater and comedy scene ever since.

History

Initial development

Co-creator/co-producer Josh Lazar was a theatre aficionado. By his junior year he had seen one or two Waa-Mu shows, the long-running revue show at Northwestern University. While Lazar respected the talent of the performers, he was disappointed in the outdated content of the shows. His opinion was shared by many students.

Lazar went to a meeting of the Associated Student Government (ASG) at Northwestern to pitch the idea for a new show he called MeeOw that would include all forms of original creative expression, including, but not limited to, music, dance, singing, acting, comedy, and poetry. Since Lazar hadn’t thought about a producer and director for the proposed new show, ASG turned him down.

In a hallway of the Foster Walker dormitory, Lazar approached undergraduate sophomore Paul Warshauer, who had also been in a production of “Streetcar Named Desire” with Lazar, and whom Lazar considered to be a consummate producer.

Warshauer agreed to co-produce the new show, and they returned to the ASG in the first week of October of 1973, to request recognition and funding as an official student organization. They brought along other theater students who had expressed interest. Warshauer and Lazar submitted the required paperwork, with Warshauer insisting on hyphenating Mee-Ow to more clearly parallel the Waa-Mu show name.

The original logo art was created by Rob Maciunas in 1973. Northwestern's mascot is a Wildcat so the logo was a tribute to the school's feline roots.

Lazar purchased a display ad entitled, "Had Enough of Waa-Mu?" in the October 8th, 1973 issue of The Daily Northwestern. After a few initial meetings, the group was recognized as a student organization by the Northwestern Student Government early in 1974.  Additional funding was supplied by Patrick Goldstein then chairman of the arts organization known as "Orgy of the Arts." With official recognition, an office, and a storage locker in the Norris Student Center, the group grew to include a set designer, Chris Rusch, a marketing and promotion Director, Terri Blum, a music director, George Lisle, a "Surrealist-in-Residence", Joseph Radding, and the show's first director, Jeff Wilson.

"Mee-Ow" was created in reaction to the "closed door policies" of the venerable Waa-Mu Show, Northwestern's long running annual musical revue. A new open door policy, based on the philosophy of Henry Miller, that "Everyman is an artist." Submission of material began immediately and included poetry, original songs, comedy sketches and dance routines. An overarching theme of traveling through time was put in place based on the material submitted. The show featured traditional song and dance numbers, poetry, and sketch comedy. The orchestra was directed by George Lisle.

The first Mee-Ow Show ran April 12, 13 and 14, 1974setting the stage for what would become one of the longest running student-created improvisational shows in the U.S.

Later years
In 1975, after mixed reviews and political and financial issues, the Mee-Ow Show was re-conceived and directed by three of its cast members, Bill Nuss, Eugene "Dusty" Kay, and Richard "Rick" Kotrba as a musical comedy revue with a smaller cast, taking its inspiration from Chicago's The Second City, Kentucky Fried Theatre and Monty Python. The dance numbers were choreographed by Wendy Taucher and Karen Pepper served as music director. Richard Kotrba served as "Comedy Coordinator," thus beginning the long legacy of comedy and improvisation as the basis for future shows. Kay and Nuss co-directed the '75 and '76 versions.

According to cast member Jeff Lupetin, the first time audience suggestions were taken from the audience was 1977. Music has been a part of the show since 1974 in one form or another either with a show band, keyboardist or combo. According to cast member Rush Pearson, Mee-Ow featured "And The and the And Thes," the first rock band in 1982. 

Although performances were limited at first to two venues in Norris University Center (McCormick Auditorium and the Louis Room), additional performances started at Shanley Hall in 1982.

A great number of Mee-Ow alumni have gone on to perform and teach improv at many of the country's top improv venues, such as Chicago's The Second City, iO Theater and the Annoyance Theater, New York's Magnet Theater, The P.I.T., The Upright Citizens Brigade Theatre, LA's Groundlings, iO WEST, and UCB West. Mee-Ow alumni also founded Boom Chicago in Amsterdam and created the popular TV series Whose Line is it Anyway?

An extensive archive of the Mee-Ow Show from its first show to the present is maintained in the Northwestern Archives in the Deering Library in Evanston.

Notable participants
 Craig Bierko - Actor, The Music Man, Cinderella Man, Scary Movie 3
 Heather Anne Campbell - Writer, Saturday Night Live, Actor Whose Line is it Anyway?
 Ana Gasteyer - Actor, Saturday Night Live
 Eric Gilliland - Writer/Producer, Roseanne, 'That 70's Show, 'Mr. Sunshine
 John Lehr - Creator/Actor, 10 Items or Less
 Julia Louis-Dreyfus - Actor, Saturday Night Live, Seinfeld, The New Adventures of Old Christine, VEEP
 Jessica Lowe - Actor, Blended, Minx, The Righteous Gemstones
 J.P. Manoux - Actor, The Emperor's New School
 Josh Meyers - Actor, MADtv, That '70s Show
 Seth Meyers - Actor/Head Writer, Saturday Night Live, Late Night
 John Cameron Mitchell - Actor, Director, and Writer, Hedwig and the Angry Itch
 Dermot Mulroney - Actor, My Best Friend's Wedding, The Family Stone
 Allyson Rice - Actor, As the World Turns
 Romy Rosemont - Actor, Glee
 Kristen Schaal - Actor, Flight of the Conchords

Past productions
2023: The Cast: Liv Drury, Anelga Hajjar, Sam Buttress, Orly Lewittes, Alondra Rios, Brendan Dahl, Arjun Kumar, Ferd Moscat.
The Staff Co-Director: Liv Drury, Co-Director: Anelga Hajjar
Producer: Julia Kruger Band director: Tabor Brewster
Stage manager: Henry Patton Set designer (week 4): Jessica Vallan
Set designer (week 8): Sunnie Eraso Sound designer: Nick Kapp
Lighting designer: Katherine Li Assistant Lighting designer (week 8): Julia Marshall Prop designer: Amelia Reyes-Gomez Graphic designer: Nick Hollenbeck Assistant Producer/Assistant stage manager: Cooper Silverman. The Band:  Drums/Band Director: Tabor Brewster 
Singer: Julia Stork  Singer: Sarika Rao 
Singer: Piper Fishkind  Keyboard: Khoi Lee 
Trombone: Jackson Spellman  Saxophone: Jason Zhu 
Bass: Noah Rabinovitch  Guitar: Sam Marshall 

2022: January, How Do They Pee In Mee-Owter Space? February, Mee-Ow You See Me.  Co-Director & Cast Member, Sam Buttress, Co-Director & Cast Member, Carden Katz. Cast Members: Anelga Hajjar, Jared Zavala, Alondra Rios, Orly Lewittes, Liv Drury, Emily Pate-Some, Justin Kuhn,  Co-Producer Kathryn Bowman & Grant Albright. The Band was Ground Control: Clay Eshleman, Tabor Brewster, Sam Marshall and Noah Rabinovitch, with singers Riva Akolawala and Dana Hinchliffe. NU Daily Northwestern

2021: "Get Mee-Owt of My Head!!" Directors: Jasmine Sharma, Arshad Baruti, Carly Griffin-Fiorella, Producer: Lily Feinberg Cast: Willa Barnett, Carden Katz, Emily Pate-Somé, Anelga Hajjar, and Sam Buttress

2020: January 2020 Mee-Ow Show, "America's Next Top Meeowdel." Produced by Jackie Orlando. Directors: Jake Curtis & Ross Turkington.  Cast: Jasmine Sharma, Arshad Baruti, Graham Kirstein, Carly Griffin-Fiorella, Sydney Feyder, Willa Barnett, Carden Katz February 2020 Mee-Ow Show, "Meeowdle School Dance." Produced by Jackie Orlando. Directors: Jake Curtis & Ross Turkington. Cast: Jasmine Sharma, Arshad Baruti, Graham Kirstein, Carly Griffin-Fiorella, Sydney Feyder, Willa Barnett, Carden Katz.

2019: "Mee-Owdieval Times" & "In Mee-Owmoriam" Directors: Jake Daniels and Maya Armstrong. Producer: Jackie Orlando. Cast: Maya Armstrong, Jake Daniels, Amara Leonard, Edson Montenegro, Makasha Copeland, Jake Curtis, Ross Turkington, Willa Barnett, Jasmine Sharma. Featuring the band Honey Butter. Band Leaders: Jacob Galdes and Oliver Holden-Moses. Mee-Ow Singers: Morgan Buckley and Nicole Rinne. Band Members: Austin Klewan, Dan Peters, George Estey, Peter Hoerenz, Sam Wolsk, Jamie Eder

2018: "Take Mee-Ow to the Ballgame" & "The Mee-Owstery Machine" Directors: Devyn Johnson and Nabeel Muscatwalla. Producer: Alex Schwartz. Cast: Makaa Copeland, Jake Curtis, Maya Armstrong, Jake Daniels, Amara Leonard, Joey Lieberman, Julianne Lang, Devyn Johnson, Nabeel Muscatwalla. Band leader: Ryan Savage Vocals: Meryl Crock, Bria Kalpen, Lizzie Zhang, Synth & Rap Vocals: Gabriel Shelhorse, Lead Guitar: Conor Jones, Rhythm Guitar & Vocals: Slade Warnken, Drums: Luke Peterson, Keyboard: Alejandro Paredes, Auxiliary Percussion: Dimitris Goulimaris, Bass: Ben Krege

2017: "Mee-Ow Enters the Twilight Zone" and "Mee-Ow’s Anatomy" Produced by: Devon Levy. Directed by: Izzy Gerasole and Ben Gauthier. Featuring: Ben Gauthier, Izzy Gerasole, Will Altabef, Dan Leahy, Devyn Johnson, Nabeel Muscatwalla, Harry Wood, Allie Levitan, Maya Armstrong. Featuring the band Moonlight Palace: Alex Warshawsky, Music Director. Ogi Ifediora, Aiden Fisher, Julius Tucker, Leo Galbraith-Paul, Victor Lalo, Curtis Boysen, Lorenzo Gonzalez-Lamassonne.

2016: "Ctrl Alt Mee-Ow" & "Speak Mee-Ow or Forever Hold Your Peace" Directors: Jack Olin and Natalie Rotter-Laitman. Cast: Chanse McCrary, Ben Gauthier, Izzy Gerasole, Will Altabef, Eva Victor, Caroline Reedy, Dan Leahy. Producer: Devon Levy Singer: Jessie Pinnick.

2015 "Mee-Ow Presents: THE TRUTH" & "The 87th Annual AcadeMEE-OWards" Dir: Nick DiMaso, Dir: Emma Cadd, Scott Egleston, Ben Gauthier, Alex Heller, Chanse McCrary, Jack Olin, Natalie Rotter-Laitman, Anne Sundell, Producer: Mallory Harrington.

2014 (40th Anniversary Show)  "You're Invited to Mee-Owy Kate and Ashley's Sleepover Party" & "Mee-Ow Kills Curiosity: A Tail of Revenge" Dir: Amina Munir, Dir: Emma Cadd, Pat Buetow, Nick DiMaso, Scott Egleston, Gaby Febland, Jack Olin, Laurel Zoff Pelton, Producer: Alexander Gold

2013 "Mee-Ow Presents: The Great Catsby" & "Mee-Ow That's What I Call Comedy! Vol. 40!" Dir: Sam Fishell, Dir: Emily Olcott, Pat Buetow, Emma Cadd, Gaby Febland, Matthew Hays, Michael Janak, Amina Munir, Brendan Scannell, Producer: Francesca Mennella

2012 "Dr. Faustus Mee-Owstus" & "Three's Company, Ten's Mee-Ow" Dir: Nick Gertonson, Dir: Caroline Goldfarb, Sam Fishell, Matthew Hays, Drigan Lee, Tucker May, Amina Munir, Emily Olcott, Austin Perry, Brendan Scannell

2011 "Mee-Ow Is Dating A Monster" & "Glee-Ow: Mee-Ow Sells Out" Danielle Calvert, Dir: Aaron Eisenberg, Sam Fishell, Nick Gertonson, Caroline Goldfarb, Tucker May, Ryan Nunn, Isabel Richardson, Dir: Marie Semla, Producer: Jeremy Shpizner

2010 "The Mee-Ow Show: A Tail of Nine Lives" & "The Mee-Ow Kids Solve a Murder at Chuck Fuffalo's" Dir: Jen D'Angelo, James Daniel, Aaron Eisenberg, Nick Gertonson, Dir: Tim McGovern, Ryan Nunn, Isabel Richardson, Marie Semla, Josh Waytz

2009 "Mee-Ow Presents Dr. Pepper's Homely Joke Brigade" & "Mee-Ow Screws the Pooch" Jen D'Angelo, James Daniel, Tim McGovern, Jessica McKenna, Jack Novak, Joel Sinensky, Sarah Grace Welbourn, Conner White

2008 "Mee-Ow is the Winter of our Discontent" & "Mee-Ow Talks Down to Children" Dan "DR" Bruhl, Carly Ciarrocchi, James Daniel, Dan Foster, Jessica McKenna, Jack Novak, Sarah Grace Welbourn, Adam Welton, Producer: Zora Senat

2007 "Mee/Ow '08: Mee-Ow Declares Its Candidacy" & "Mee-Ow's Anatomy" Dan Bruhl, Carly Ciarrocchi, Chris Hejl, Nick Kanellis, Jessica Lowe, Jack Novak, Matt Sheelen, Adam Welton

2006 "Mee-Ow is Dead" & "Mee-Ow Pulls Out . . .of Iraq" Russ Armstrong, Dir: John Dixon, Nick Kanellis, Jessica Lowe, Kelly O’Sullivan, Matt Sheelen, Adam Welton, Nayla Wren

2005 "Mee-Ow Admits, Mee-Ow has a Problem" & "Mee-Ow Goes to Old Orchard" Russ Armstrong, John Dixon, Briggs Hatton, Nick Kanellis, Jessica Lowe, Peter McNerney, Dir: Bridget Moloney, Joanna Simmons

2004 "Danger on University Place" & "It’s Not You it’s Mee-Ow" John Dixon, Briggs Hatton, Jason Kessler, Bridget Moloney, Kate Mulligan, Joe Petrilla, Sheila Shaigany, Dir: Dan Sinclair, Producer: Jack Sachs

2003 "Mee-Ow Saves Christmas" & "There’s a Bear in The Theater" Chris Gorbos, Briggs Hatton, Jason Kessler, Dir: Martha Marion, Alex Marlin, Bridget Moloney, Kate Mulligan, Dan Sinclair, Producer: Dory Weiss

2002 "Mee-Owed to be an American" Laura Grey, Ryan Harrison, Jess Lacher, Dan Mahoney, Martha Marion, Kate Mulligan, Lee Overtree, Frank Smith, Producer: Dory Weiss

2001 Drew Calendar, Laura Grey, Ryan Harrison, Jess Lacher, Dan Mahoney, Martha Marion, Matt McKenna, Lee Overtree

2000 "Mee-Ow on Ice" and "Don't Tread on Mee-Ow." Heather Campbell, Lauren Flans, Ryan Harrison, Luke Hatton, Jess Lacher, Matt McKenna, Kristen Schaal, Scott Speiser

1999 "The Last Mee-Ow Show Ever" David Asher, Liz Cackowski, Heather Campbell, Luke Hatton, Jamey Roberts, Kristen Schaal, Michael Sinclair, Scott Speiser. Music Director: Marco Paguia.

1998 "Get in Touch with your Pussy." Liz Cackowski, Heather Campbell, Luke Hatton, Josh Meyers, Ryan Raddatz, Jemey Roberts, Robin Shorr, Justin Spitzer, David Terry Band: Marco Paguia, Jason Kanakis

1997 "The Mee-Owt Siders" Jill Alexander, Heather Campbell, Josh Meyers, Ryan Raddatz, Jamey Roberts, Robin Shorr, David Terry Band: Ian Thompson, Paul Giallorenzo, Jason Kanakis, Bevin Ryness, Marshall Greenhouse. Sound Technician: Brian Cohen.

1996 "Mee-Ow Say Tongue" and "It's a Wonderful Lie." Jill Alexander, Peter Grosz, Rob Janas, Laura McKenzie, Seth Meyers, Ryan Raddatz, Robin Shorr, Sarah Yarra  Band: Dan Lipton, Jason Kanakis, Marahall Greenhouse, Ian Thompson

1995 "For Whom the Bell Curves" and "Pope Fiction." Jill Alexander, Ed Herbstman, Rob Janas, Louise Lamson, Jean Villepique, Dan Weiss, Adrian Wenner, Liv Oslund

1994 "Politically Erect" and "Teach Mee-Ow to Love Again." Jill Alexander, Ed Herbstman, Louise Lamson, Ethan Sandler, Jean Villepique, Amanda Weier, Dan Weiss, Jason Winer, Adrian Wenner

1993 "The Tao of Mee-Ow" Directed by Ed Herbstman. Colby Bessera, Anjali Bhimani, Abby Cohen, Ed Herbstman, Ethan Sandler, Deborah Stern, Paul Vaillancourt, Jean Villepique, Amanda Weier, Dan Weiss, Adrian Wenner

1992 "It’s a Wonderful Life Sentence" and "Dental Dam Yankees." Lesley Bevan, Scott Duff, Anne Eggleston, Daniele Gaither, Chris Grady, Lillie Hubscher, Mark Kretzmann, Bruce McCoy, Jean Villepique

1991 "Are You There God? It’s Mee-Ow" and "Lawrence of Your Labia." Produced by Peter Glawatz. Directed by J.P. Manoux. Lesley Bevan, George Brant, Daniele Gaither, Rachel Hamilton, Mark Kretzmann, Bruce McCoy, Jon Mozes, Kirsten Nelson

1990 "Sunday Eating Pork with George" Jill Cargerman, Jason De Santo, Kate Fry, Lillie Hubscher, Spencer Kayden, J. P. Manoux, Philip Pawelczyk, Greg Rice, Jon Rosenfeld

1989 "Salvador's Deli" Bo Blackburn, Jill Cargerman, Tim Ereneta, Ana Gasteyer, Mary Jackman, Spencer Kayden, Eric Letzinger, J. P. Manoux, Philip Pawelczyk

1988 "Mee-Ow Tse Tung" Bo Blackburn, Betsy Braham, Jill Cargerman, Tim Ereneta, Stu Feldman, Ana Gasteyer, Jessica Hughes, John Lehr, Jerry Saslow

1987 "Eating Mee-Ow" Mollie Allen, Bo Blackburn, Jon Craven, Marc Goldsmith, Melanie Hoopes, Lisa Houle, John Lehr, Catherine Newman, Jerry Saslow, Matt Wolka

1986 "Oedipuss ‘n’ Boots" Mollie Allen, Dave Clapper, Jon Craven, Andy Hirsch, Lisa Houle, Jessica Hughes, John Lehr, Barry Levin, Catherine Newman, Dan Patterson, Chris Pfaff.  Stuart Feldman, AD. Shows in Edinburgh.

1985 "Local an’ Aesthetic" Beth Bash, Craig Bierko, Karen Schiff, Rich Kaplan, Dermot Mulroney, Richard Radutsky, Allyson Rice, Romy Rosemont. Romy Rosemont - Director, Mark Brogger - Producer, Stuart Feldman, AD.

1984 "Escape From Baltic Avenue" Karen Cooper, Jesse Dabson, Eric Gilliland, Kelly Hughes, Rich Kaplan, Wendy Messing, John Cameron Mitchell, Dermot Mulroney, Richard Radutsky, Romy Rosemont. Eric Gilliland - Director, Mark Brogger - Producer

1983 "Wake Up Yo Tinheads!" Taylor Abbot, Mark Gunnion, Tammyi Hinz, Chris Heuben, Sue Klein, Ellen Kohrman, Mark Lancaster, Michael Simon

1982 "‘Til The Cows Come Home...Where are Those Damn Cows?" Steve Beavers, Rob Chaskin, John Goodrich, Chris Hueben, Mark Lancaster, Laura Matalon, Sarah Partridge, Susan Wapner

1981 "Candy From Strangers" Bekka Eaton, John Goodrich, Mark Lancaster, Bill Lopatto, Julia Louis-Dreyfus, Michael Markowitz, Ken Marks, Rod McLachlan, Sandy Snyder, Larry Shanker - Piano

1980 "Ten Against the Empire" Paul Barrosse, John Goodrich, Julia Louis-Dreyfus, Rod McLaughlin, Michael Markowitz, Ken Marks, Dana Olsen, Rush Pearson, Judy Pruitt, Larry Shanker - Piano

1979 "...But is it Art?" Bill Aiken, Paul Barrosse, Winnie Freedman, Meryl Friedman, John Goodrich, Barb Guarino, Althea Haropulos, Dana Olsen, Rush Pearson, Larry Shanker - Piano

1978 "In Search of the Ungnome" Paul Barrosse, Jerry Franklin, Shelly Goldstein, Jane Mueller, Kyle T. Heffner, Ken Marks, Dana Olsen, Rush Pearson, Tina Rosenberg, Bill Wronski, Larry Shanker - Piano

1977 "North By Northwestern" Peter Bales, Betsy Fink, Janie Fried, Kyle Hefner, Jeff Lupetin, Cindy Milstein, Brad Mott, Dana Olsen, Suzie Plaksin, Keith Reddin, Tom Virtue, Allison Burnett.

1976 "Spirit, My Ass" Dusty Kay, Peter Bales, Betsy Fink, Jeff Lupetin, Alice Tell, Stew Figa, Kyle Heffner, Keith Reddin

1975 "What Did You Expect?" Carol Appleby, Mike Bonner, Eloise Jane Coopersmith, Betsy Fink, Thomas Fitzgerald, Wendy Gajewski, Neal Gold, David Garrett, Michelle Holmes, Roy Alan Hine, Curtis Katz, Laurie Karon, Kathy Kirshenbaum, Dusty Kay, Rick Kotrba, Kitty Knecht, Charlie Lucci, Jeff Lupetin, Brad Mott, Jane McClary, Lisa Nesselson, Bill Nuss, Karen Alison Pepper, Keith Reddin, Scott Rothburd, Wendy Taucher

1974 "Just in Time" Producers/Creators Paul Warshauer and Josh Lazar. Director Jeff Wilson. The Company: Terri Blum, Devan Carter, Bob Chimbel, Sue Cibrario, Carol Cling, Sue Devero, Ken Elliott, Ron Ensel, Meredith Freeman, Jonathan Fox, Debbie Gaber, Wendy Gajewski, Nancy Gordon, Sandy Grimsley, Holly Hartle, Bill Hindin, Steve Humphrey, Marla Jones, Randy Kaplan, Robbie Karnofsky, Dusty Kay, Rick Kotrba, Jerry Larkin, Josh Lazar, Barb Mallorie, Kevin McDermott, Wendy Nadler, Bill Nuss, Rod Oram, Alan Perkins, Russ Pishnery, Tom Reese, Sandy Richens, Patti Rubin, Debbie Sauer, Joe Schuster, Suzanne Sciez, Obie Story, Wendy Taucher, Jeaninee Tortelli, Lisa Wershaw.  The Orchestra consisted of Daryl Stehlic, Dave Boruff, Mark Running, Benjy Stemple, Bruce Reed, Malcolm McDonald, Susie Fox, Peter Kallish, Kevin Hosten, Mike Privitera, Janet Steidl, Harvey Hubcap, and George Lisle.

References 

Northwestern University
1974 establishments in Illinois